Murray McDermott (2 February 1950 – 2003) was a Scottish professional footballer who played as a goalkeeper, making over 500 career appearances.

Career
Born in Edinburgh, McDermott played for Crossroads United, Rangers, Penicuik Athletic, Raith Rovers, Berwick Rangers, Greenock Morton, Arbroath, Meadowbank Thistle, Partick Thistle and Hearts.

See also
 List of footballers in Scotland by number of league appearances (500+)

References

1950 births
2003 deaths
Scottish footballers
Rangers F.C. players
Penicuik Athletic F.C. players
Raith Rovers F.C. players
Berwick Rangers F.C. players
Greenock Morton F.C. players
Arbroath F.C. players
Livingston F.C. players
Partick Thistle F.C. players
Heart of Midlothian F.C. players
Scottish Football League players
Association football goalkeepers